Acrocercops rhothiastis is a moth of the family Gracillariidae. It is known from Nigeria.

The larvae feed on Bridelia micrantha. They probably mine the leaves of their host plant.

References

Endemic fauna of Nigeria
rhothiastis
Moths of Africa
Moths described in 1921
Insects of West Africa